Ezra Dean (April 9, 1795 – January 25, 1872) was an American lawyer and politician who served two terms as a U.S. Representative from Ohio from 1841 to 1845.

Early life and career
Born in Hillsdale, New York, Dean attended the common schools.
In the War of 1812, he was appointed ensign in the Eleventh Regiment of United States Infantry April 17, 1814.
He was commissioned as a lieutenant October 1, 1814, as recognition for meritorious conduct at the sortie of Fort Erie.
At the close of the war, he was placed in command of a revenue cutter on Lake Champlain.

He resigned the military to study law and was admitted to the bar in Plattsburgh, New York, in 1823.
He settled in Wooster, Ohio in 1824 and commenced the practice of law.
He served as postmaster of Wooster from 1828 to 1832, and as president judge of the court of common pleas from 1834 to 1841.

U.S. House
Dean was elected as a Democrat to the Twenty-seventh and Twenty-eighth Congresses (March 4, 1841 – March 4, 1845). He served as chairman of the Committee on the Militia (Twenty-eighth Congress). He was not a candidate for renomination in 1844.

Retirement and death
He resumed the practice of law in Wooster.
He moved to Ironton, Ohio, in 1867, and died there January 25, 1872.
He was interred in Woodland Cemetery.

Sources

1795 births
1872 deaths
People from Hillsdale, New York
People from Wooster, Ohio
People from Ironton, Ohio
Ohio lawyers
Democratic Party members of the United States House of Representatives from Ohio
United States Army personnel of the War of 1812
United States Army officers
19th-century American politicians
19th-century American lawyers